Elkem Meraker, formerly known as Meraker Smelteverk, was a microsilica plant located at Kopperå in Meråker, Norway. The plant was established in 1898 to manufacture carbide, put later rebuilt to manufacture microsilica. In 1981, it was sold from Union Carbide to Elkem. Products were transported along the Meråker Line to the port at Muruvik, where they were shipped abroad. The plant closed in 2006.

Influential manager from 1906 to 1928 was Iver Høy. At the time, the plant was owned by Meraker Brug. It was sold to an American company in 1928.

References

Companies based in Trøndelag
Manufacturing companies established in 1898
Manufacturing companies disestablished in 2006
Orkla ASA
Meråker
1898 establishments in Norway
2006 disestablishments in Norway